Holiday Land is a 1934 American animated short film made by Screen Gems as the first in their Color Rhapsody series. It also features Screen Gems' current star, Scrappy, in his first color appearance.

The short was nominated at the 1934 Academy Awards for Academy Award for Best Animated Short Film but lost to The Tortoise and the Hare.

Summary
Scrappy, a recurring character with his own series, is awakened by his alarm clock, does not want to get up and go to school. Tossing in his bed, he wishes that "today was a holiday." The wind blows pages off his wall calendar, which produce "holidays" in the forms of their mascots (Father Time, Santa Claus, the Easter Bunny, a Thanksgiving turkey, a Halloween witch, etc.) Scrappy enjoys various holiday celebrations until he is awakened by his mother's voice. He quickly makes his morning routine, dresses, and eats a hasty breakfast, before diving under his bedclothes to dream again!

Cast
 Beatrice Hagen, Dorothy Compton and Mary Moder as Quartet 
 Purv Pullen as Whistling Soloist And Various Characters

See also
 Color Rhapsodies
 Santa Claus in film

References

External links 
 
 

1934 short films
American animated short films
Columbia Pictures short films
1934 animated films
1930s animated short films
1930s American animated films
Screen Gems short films
Santa Claus in film
Columbia Pictures animated short films
American Christmas films
Color Rhapsody